(Lord God, we praise You), is a church cantata for New Year's Day by Johann Sebastian Bach. It was first performed on 1 January 1726 in Leipzig, as part of the composer's third cantata cycle. Its libretto is by Georg Christian Lehms, opening with the beginning of "", Luther's German Te Deum. The cantata's text was completed with a stanza from Paul Eber's "" for the closing chorale.

History and words 
Bach wrote the cantata in 1726, his third year as Thomaskantor in Leipzig, for New Year's Day, which is also the feast of the circumcision and naming of Jesus. The prescribed readings for the feast day were taken from the Epistle to the Galatians, by faith we inherit, and from the Gospel of Luke, the Circumcision and naming of Jesus. The cantata text is taken from a 1711 publication by Georg Christian Lehms, it centers on praise and thanksgiving without being related to the readings. The poet began with four lines from Martin Luther's German Te Deum, "" (Lord God, we praise you). The following pair of recitative and aria deal with thanks for past gifts, while a further pair deal with a prayer for further blessings. The poet did not supply a closing chorale, but Bach chose the final stanza of Paul Eber's "" (Help me to praise God's goodness) (c. 1580).

Bach first performed the cantata on 1 January 1726.

Scoring and structure 
The cantata in six movements is scored for three vocal soloists (alto, tenor, and bass), a four-part choir, corno da caccia, two oboes, oboe da caccia, two violins, viola, violetta (alternative in a later performance) and basso continuo.

Music 
In the opening chorus the soprano and the horn present the liturgical melody of the Te Deum, whereas the lower voices move in vivid counterpoint, but also a fourth part of oboe I and violin I. The following secco recitative ends on the words "" (O, should not therefore a new song be taken up and that we sing in heated love?). Consequently, the following movement begins attacca (without a break) with the voices' "" (Let us celebrate, let us rejoice). This unusual movement combines elements of chorus and aria in a free da capo form. The first section is dominated by the chorus, the middle section by the bass. Musicologist Julian Mincham points out that it is "an unusual and imaginative combination of aria and chorus" and likens it to the interaction between a pastor and his flock. A second secco recitative leads to a tender aria which was accompanied by an obbligato oboe da caccia in 1726. In a later performance, likely in 1734, this was replaced by a "violetta", which can be a viola or a descant viola da gamba, according to Johann Gottfried Walther. The cantata closes with a four-part chorale.

Recordings 
 J. S. Bach: Das Kantatenwerk – Sacred Cantatas Vol. 1, Gustav Leonhardt, Tölzer Knabenchor, King's college choir, Leonhardt-Consort, Paul Esswood, Marius van Altena, Max van Egmond, Teldec 1972
 Die Bach Kantate Vol. 20, Helmuth Rilling, Gächinger Kantorei, Bach-Collegium Stuttgart, Gabriele Schreckenbach, Peter Schreier, Philippe Huttenlocher, Hänssler 1981
 Bach Edition Vol. 4 – Cantatas Vol. 1, Pieter Jan Leusink, Holland Boys Choir, Netherlands Bach Collegium, Sytse Buwalda, Nico van der Meel, Bas Ramselaar, Brilliant Classics 1999
 Bach Cantatas Vol. 17: Berlin / For New Year’s Day / For the Sunday After New Year, John Eliot Gardiner, Monteverdi Choir, English Baroque Soloists, Charles Humphries, James Gilchrist, Peter Harvey, Soli Deo Gloria 2000
 J. S. Bach: Complete Cantatas Vol. 16, Ton Koopman, Amsterdam Baroque Orchestra & Choir, Bogna Bartosz, Paul Agnew, Klaus Mertens, Antoine Marchand 2001
 J. S. Bach: Cantatas for the Complete Liturgical Year Vol. 4: "Sie werden aus Saba alle kommen" – Cantatas BWV 16 · 65 · 153 · 154, Sigiswald Kuijken, La Petite Bande, Elisabeth Hermans, Petra Noskaiová, Jan Kobow, Jan van der Crabben, Accent 2006
 J. S. Bach: Cantatas Vol. 42, Masaaki Suzuki, Bach Collegium Japan, Robin Blaze, Gerd Türk, Peter Kooy, BIS 2008

References

External links 
 
 Herr Gott, dich loben wir BWV 16; BC A 23 / Sacred cantata (New Year/Circumcision) Bach Digital
 Cantata BWV 16 Herr Gott, dich loben wir history, scoring, sources for text and music, translations to various languages, discography, discussion, Bach Cantatas Website
 Luke Dahn: BWV 16.6 bach-chorales.com

Church cantatas by Johann Sebastian Bach
1726 compositions